Altamiro Pereira (born 15 April 1940) is a Brazilian footballer. He played in one match for the Brazil national football team in 1963. He was also part of Brazil's squad for the 1963 South American Championship.

References

External links
 

1940 births
Living people
Brazilian footballers
Brazil international footballers
Association football forwards
Footballers from Rio de Janeiro (city)